A record chart, also known as a music chart, is a method of ranking music judging by the popularity during a given period of time. Although primarily a marketing or supermarketing tool like any other sales statistic, they have become a form of popular media culture in their own right.

Record charts are compiled using a variety of criteria. These commonly include sales of records, cassettes and compact discs; amount of radio airplay; requests to radio disk jockeys; voting for songs by the radio listeners and, more recently, number of downloads and streams.

Some charts are specific to a particular musical genre and most to a particular geographical location. The most common period of time covered by a chart is one week, with the chart being printed or broadcast at the end of this time. Summary charts for years and decades are then calculated from their component weekly charts. Component charts have become an increasingly important way to measure the commercial success of individual songs.

Reviewers often describe records using round number milestones within a chart. For example, a record that peaks at number 7 may be called a "Top 10" hit, even when there is no chart limited to only the top 10 records in that particular location.

Africa 

 South Africa
 The Official South African Charts

 Nigeria
 TurnTable Top
 TurnTable Top 50 chart (singles chart)
 TurnTable Top 50 Album (albums chart)

Asia 
 China
 Billboard China
 China Top 100
 China Airplay/FL

 India
 IMI International Top 20 Singles

 Indonesia
 Billboard Indonesia
 Billboard Indonesia Top 100

 Japan
 Billboard Japan
 Billboard Japan Hot 100
 Oricon
 Oricon Combined Singles Chart
 Oricon Combined Albums Chart
 Oricon Singles Chart
 Oricon Albums Chart

 Malaysia
 RIM Charts

 Philippines
 Billboard Philippines
 Philippine Hot 100
 Philippine Top 20
 Catalog Chart

 Singapore
RIAS Top Charts

 South Korea
 Circle Chart
 Circle Digital Chart
 Circle Album Chart
 Circle Social Chart
 Melon Chart

 Thailand
 Thailand Top 100 by JOOX

 Vietnam
 Billboard Vietnam
 Vietnam Hot 100
 Top Vietnamese Song

Europe 

 Continental Europe 
 European Hot 100 Singles
 European Top 100 Albums

 Austria
 Ö3 Austria Top 40

 Belgium
 Ultratop
 Ultratop 50 Singles
 Ultratop 200 Albums

 Croatia
 Croatian Airplay Radio Chart

 Czech Republic
 Rádio – Top 100

 Denmark
 Hitlisten

 Finland
 The Official Finnish Charts

 France
 Syndicat National de l'Édition Phonographique

 Germany
 GfK Entertainment Charts

 Greece
 Greek IFPI singles and albums charts
 Billboard Greece
 Greek Airplay Charts

 Hungary
 Association of Hungarian Record Companies

 Ireland
 Irish Recorded Music Association
 Irish Singles Chart
 Irish Downloads Chart
 Irish Albums Chart
 Irish Independent Albums Chart

 Italy
 Federazione Industria Musicale Italiana

 Netherlands
 GfK Netherlands
 Single Top 100
 Album Top 100

 Norway
 VG-lista

 Poland
 Polish Society of the Phonographic Industry
 Polish music charts
 OLiS 

 Portugal
 Top Oficial da AFP

 Romania
Romanian record charts:
Romanian Top 100 (1995-2012) 

 Slovakia
 Rádio – Top 100

 Spain
 Productores de Música de España

 Sweden
 Sverigetopplistan

 Switzerland
 Swiss Hitparade

 Turkey
 Billboard Türkiye
 Türkçe Top 20
 Türkiye Top 20
 Turkish Rock Top 20 Chart

 United Kingdom
 Official Charts Company
 UK Singles Chart
 UK Singles Downloads Chart
 Official Audio Streaming Chart
 Official Vinyl Singles Chart
 UK Albums Chart
 UK Album Downloads Chart
 Official Albums Streaming Chart
 Official Record Store Chart
 Official Vinyl Albums Chart
 UK Compilation Chart

North America 
 Canada
 Canadian Albums Chart
 Canadian Hot 100
 Canadian Singles Chart
 RPM

 Mexico
 Mexico Airplay (singles chart)
 Monitor Latino (singles chart)
 Top 100 Mexico (albums chart)

 United States
 Billboard
 Billboard charts
 Billboard Hot 100 (singles chart)
 Billboard 200 (albums chart)
 Cash Box (magazine)
 Mediabase
 Radio & Records
 Rolling Stone charts
 Veva Play charts

Oceania 

 Australia
 ARIA Charts
 ARIA Digital Track Chart
 ARIA Digital Album Chart

 New Zealand
 Recorded Music NZ
 Official New Zealand Music Chart

South America 

 Argentina
 Billboard Argentina Hot 100
 CAPIF charts

 Brazil
 Crowley Charts
 Top 100 Brasil
 Top Álbuns Brasil 

 Colombia
 National-Report

 Venezuela
 Record Report

See also

Bibliography 
The following books list recording artists in alphabetical order unless otherwise stated.

 Australia. Kent, David. Australian Chart Book 1940–1969: the hit songs and records from thirty years of specially compiled charts. Turramurra, N.S.W.: Australian Chart Book, 2005 
 Australia. Kent, David. Australian Chart Book 1970–1992: 23 years of hit singles & albums from the top 100 charts. Turramurra, N.S.W.: Australian Chart Book, 1993 
 Australia. Kent, David. Australian Chart Book 1993–2009: the hit singles and albums from 17 years of Australia's national charts. Turramurra, N.S.W.: Australian Chart Book, 2010 
 Australia. Kent, David. The Australian top 20 book (1940-2006): All the top 20 singles charts covering more than 67 years. Turramurra, N.S.W.: Australian Chart Book, 2007 
 Australia. Ryan, Gavin. Australia's Music Charts 1988-2010: Containing ARIA Chart information from their Singles, Albums and Music DVD Charts. Mt Martha, Vic.: Moonlight Publishing, 2011
 Australia. Barnes, Jim and Stephen Scanes. The Book: Top 40 Research 1956-2010. Gorokan, N.S.W.: Scanes Music Research, 2011 
 Austria. Wittmann, Wolfgang. Österreichisches Hitlexikon. 1956-1983/84. Graz: DBV Verlag, 1984 
 Belgium. Collin, Robert. Het Belgisch Hitboek: 45 jaar hits in Vlaanderen: 1954-1999. Lier: Vox, 1999 
 Belgium. Jaspers, Sam. Ultratop 20.000 hits!: 1995-2005. Deurne (Antwerpen): Book & Media Publishing, 2006 
 Canada. Lwin, Nanda. The Canadian singles chart book: 1975–1996. Mississauga, Ont.: Music Data Canada, 1996 
 Canada. Lwin, Nanda. Top 40 hits: the essential chart guide. Mississauga, Ont.: Music Data Canada, 2000 
 Canada. Lwin, Nanda. Top albums: the essential chart guide. Toronto: Music Data Research, 2003 
 Canada. Tarling, Brian. RPM's Pop Charted Songs: From June 24, 1964 to February 10, 1990. Burnaby, B.C.: Brian Tarling, 2015  854p.
 Canada. Tarling, Brian. RPM's Pop Charted Tracks: Hit Songs From Across Canada: 1990 to 2000. Burnaby, B.C.: Brian Tarling, 2018 432p.
 Denmark. Jensen, Andrew & Jan Poulsen. Hitlisten, alt om 2.015 hits på Tjeklisten. Copenhagen: Gyldendal, 2005 
 Finland. Pennanen, Timo. Sisältää hitin: levyt ja esittäjät Suomen musiikkilistoilla vuodesta 1972. Helsingissä: Otava, 2006 
 Finland. Lassila, Juha. Mitä suomi soittaa?: hittilistat 1954-87. Jyväskylä: Jyväskylän yliopisto, Nykykulttuurin tutkimusyksikkö, 1990 
 France. Habib, Elia. Muz hit .tubes: tubes, numéros 1, disques d'or, charts, 1984-2002. Rouillon: Alinéa bis éd., 2002 
 France. King, Alex. Hit-parade: 20 ans de tubes. Paris: Editions Pascal, 2005 
 France. Suiveng, Yannick. Dictionnaire des tubes en France: 1950-2010, 60 ans de hits !. Domptin: Carrefour du net, 2010 
 Germany. Ehnert, Günter. Hit Bilanz: deutsche Chart Singles: 1956-1980. Hamburg: Taurus Press, 1990 
 Germany. Ehnert, Günter. Hit Bilanz: deutsche Chart Singles: 1981-1990. Hamburg: Taurus Press, 1994 
 Germany. Ehnert, Günter. Hit Bilanz: deutsche Chart Singles: 1991-2000. Hamburg: Taurus Press, 2002 
 Germany. Ehnert, Günter. Hit Bilanz: deutsche Chart Singles: 1956-2001 CD-ROM. Hamburg: Taurus Press, 2002 
 Germany. Ehnert, Günter. Hit Bilanz: Singles 1956-1980 Top 10. Hamburg: Taurus Press, 1990  chronological
 Germany. Ehnert, Günter. Hit Bilanz: Singles 1981-2000 Top 10. Hamburg: Taurus Press, 2001  chronological
 Germany. Ehnert, Günter. Hit Bilanz: LP 1962-1986. Hamburg: Taurus Press, 1988 
 Germany. Amtage, Jörg & Matthias Müller. Alle Hits aus Deutschlands Charts 1954-2003. Berlin: Pro Business, 2003  (2 vols.)
 Germany. 30 Jahre Single-Hitparade die Jahres-Single-Hitparaden vom 20. Dez. 1959 bis 15. Dez. 1988. Starnberg: Keller, 1989 (Supplement: 40 Jahre Single-Hitparade: Ergänzungsband 1989-1998 (2000))
 Ireland. Gogan, Larry. The Larry Gogan book of Irish chart hits. Dublin: Maxwell in association with RTÉ Radio 2, 1987 
 Ireland. Kelly, Eddie. The complete guide to Ireland's top ten hits 1954-1979. Dublin: Original Writing, 2010 
 Italy. Padovano, Romy. Hit parade: classifiche, dischi, artisti dagli anni '50 ai nostri giorni. Milan: Mondadori, 1997 
 Italy. Salvatori, Dario. 40 anni di hit parade italiana: [le canzoni, gli interpreti, i record e le curiosità di tutte le classifiche dal 1957 a oggi]. Firenze: Tarab, 1999 
 Italy. Spinetoli, John Joseph. Artisti In Classifica: I Singoli: 1960-1999. Milano: Musica e dischi, 2000
 Italy. Spinetoli, John Joseph. Artisti In Classifica: I Album: 1970-1996. Milano: Musica e dischi, 1997
 Japan. Single Chart-Book Complete Edition 1968–2010. Tokyo: Oricon, 2012 
 Japan. Album Chart-Book Complete Edition 1970–2005. Tokyo: Oricon, 2006 
 Netherlands. Hit dossier: 1939 tot 1998: samengesteld door Johann van Slooten met medewerking van de stichting Nederlandse top 40. Haarlem: Becht, 1998 
 Netherlands. Top 40 Hitdossier: 1965-2017. ['s-Graveland]: Just Publishers, 2017 
 Netherlands. Arens, Bart, Edgar Kruize and Ed Adams. Mega Top 50 presenteert: 50 jaar hitparade: zoals wekelijks uitgezonden bij de publieke omroep tussen 1963 en 2013. Houten: Spectrum, Uitgeverij Unieboek, 2013 
 New Zealand. Freeman, Warwick. New Zealand Top 20 Singles of the Sixties. Warkworth: Warwick Raymond Freeman, 2016  205p. 
 New Zealand. Scapolo, Dean. The complete New Zealand music charts, 1966–2006: singles, albums, DVDs, compilations. Wellington: Maurienne House, 2007 
 Norway. Gilde, Torre. Den store norske hitboka: en komplett guide til populaermuikken i norge 1958-1993. Oslo: Exlex, 1994 
 South Africa. Kimberley, C. South Africa Chart Book. Harare: C. Kimberley, 1997
 Spain. Salaverri, Fernando. Sólo éxitos: 1959-2012. Madrid: Fundación SGAE, 2015 
 Sweden. Hallberg, Eric. Eric Hallberg presenterar Kvällstoppen i P3: Sveriges radios topplista över veckans 20 mest sålda skivor 10/7 1962-19/8 1975. Värmdö: Drift musik, 1993 
 Sweden. Hallberg, Eric and Ulf Henningsson. Eric Hallberg, Ulf Henningsson presenterar Tio i topp med de utslagna på försök 1961-74. Stockholm: Premium, 2012 
 Sweden. Wendt, Wille. Topplistan: the official Swedish single & album charts 1975–1993. Stockholm: Premium, 1993 
 Switzerland. Hufschmid, Gusty. 33 Jahre Schweizer Hitparade — Single Charts. Starnberg: J. Keller, 2001 
 United Kingdom. The Virgin book of British hit singles. Volume 2. London: Virgin Books, 2010 
 United Kingdom. The Virgin book of Top 40 charts. London: Virgin Books, 2010  chronological
 United Kingdom. The Virgin book of British hit albums. London: Virgin Books, 2009 
 United Kingdom. Warwick, Neil et al. The complete book of the British charts: singles & albums. London: Omnibus Press, 2004  
Note: The four books above have been superseded by the Betts/OCC set of books, thus: 
 United Kingdom. Betts, Graham. The Official Charts & Hits - The Fifties. London: Official UK Charts Company, 2020 
 United Kingdom. Betts, Graham. The Official xx Hits Book (60s; 70s; 80s; 90s; 00s; 10s). London: Official UK Charts Company, 2019-20 six volumes
 United Kingdom. Betts, Graham. The Official Singles Charts: 70s; 80s; 90s; 00s; 10s. London: Official UK Charts Company, 2019-20 five chronological volumes
 United Kingdom. Betts, Graham. The Official Albums Charts: 70s; 80s; 90s; 00s; 10s. London: Official UK Charts Company, 2019-20 five chronological volumes
 United Kingdom. Betts, Graham. The Official Compilations Charts: 90s; 00s; 10s. London: Official UK Charts Company, 2019-20 three chronological volumes
 United Kingdom. Rees, Dafydd et al. 40 years of NME charts. London: Boxtree, 1995  chronological
 United Kingdom. Rees, Dafydd et al. 30 years of NME album charts. London: Boxtree, 1995  chronological
 United Kingdom. White George R. British Hit EPs 1955-1989. York: Music Mentor, 2014 
 United States. Joel Whitburn's Billboard pop hits, singles & albums, 1940–1954. Menomonee Falls, Wisc.: Record Research, 2002 
 United States. Joel Whitburn’s Top Pop Singles 1955–2018. Menomonee Falls, Wisc.: Record Research, 2019
 United States. Joel Whitburn's Top Pop Albums 1955-2016. Menomonee Falls, Wisc.: Record Research, 2018
 United States. Whitburn, Joel. Billboard Hot 100 Charts. Menomonee Falls, Wisc.: Record Research, various dates (comprises 1950s; The Sixties; The Seventies; The Eighties; The Nineties; The 2000s) chronological
 United States. Joel Whitburn presents Billboard Pop Album Charts 1965-1969. Menomonee Falls, Wisc.: Record Research, 1993  chronological
 Zimbabwe. Kimberley, C. Zimbabwe: singles chart book. Harare: C. Kimberley, 2000
 Zimbabwe. Kimberley, C. Albums chart book: Zimbabwe. Harare: C. Kimberley, 1998

External links 
 Charts all over the world
 International Chart Companies 

 List
Record charts